"Passenger Seat" is a song recorded by American country music group SHeDAISY. It was released in January 2004 as the lead-off single from the group's album Sweet Right Here.  The song was written by SHeDAISY member Kristyn Osborn, with Connie Harrington.

Content
"Passenger Seat" is a moderate up-tempo, driven primarily by acoustic guitar. The narrator describes the feelings of being in love, and makes reference to life being sweeter in the "passenger seat".

The title of the album, Sweet Right Here, was derived from lyrics in the chorus.

Music video
A music video was released for the song, and was the first to be directed by Kristin Barlowe. The video begins with the members of SHeDAISY riding through the countryside in a Volkswagen van. They pull over when they see a man sitting on the side of the road, and Kassidy gets out to greet him. The man gets in the van with them and they continue down the road, being joined by a group of bikers, who begin to follow them. Kristyn gets out of the van to greet one of the bikers, and gets on the back his bike and begins to flirt with the guy. The van and bikers pull over at an old broken down freak show. The two girls continue to flirt with their guys and also perform on a stage, surrounded by performers, before pulling away in their van.

Chart performance
"Passenger Seat" debuted at number 44 on the U.S. Billboard Hot Country Singles & Tracks for the week of February 7, 2004. The song spent 20 weeks on the U.S. Billboard Hot Country Singles & Tracks chart, reaching a peak of number 12 in June 2004.

Year-end charts

References

2004 singles
SHeDAISY songs
Song recordings produced by Dann Huff
Lyric Street Records singles
Songs written by Connie Harrington
Songs written by Kristyn Osborn
2004 songs